German submarine U-540 was a Type IXC U-boat of Nazi Germany's Kriegsmarine during World War II.

She was laid down at the Deutsche Werft (yard) in Hamburg as yard number 361 on 12 May 1942, launched on 18 December and commissioned on 10 March 1943 with Kapitänleutnant Lorenz Kasch in command.

U-540 began her service career with training as part of the 4th U-boat Flotilla from 10 March 1943. She was reassigned to the 10th flotilla for operations on 1 October.

She carried out one patrol and did not sink any ships. She was a member of one wolfpack.

She was sunk on 17 October 1943 east of Cape Farewell (Greenland) by British aircraft.

Design
German Type IXC/40 submarines were slightly larger than the original Type IXCs. U-540 had a displacement of  when at the surface and  while submerged. She had two shafts and two  propellers.

U-540 was fitted with six  torpedo tubes (four fitted at the bow and two at the stern), 22 torpedoes, one  SK C/32 naval gun, 180 rounds, and a  SK C/30 as well as a  C/30 anti-aircraft gun. The boat had a complement of forty-eight.

Service history

Patrol and loss
The boat departed Kiel on 11 September 1943, moved through the North Sea, negotiated the gap between Iceland and the Faroe Islands and entered the Atlantic Ocean.

She was sunk on 17 October 1943 east of Cape Farewell (Greenland) by depth charges dropped from two British Liberators of No. 59 Squadron RAF and 120 Squadron.

Fifty-five men died; there were no survivors.

Wolfpacks
U-540 took part in one wolfpack, namely:
 Schlieffen (16 – 17 October 1943)

References

Bibliography

External links

German Type IX submarines
U-boats commissioned in 1943
U-boats sunk in 1943
World War II submarines of Germany
1942 ships
World War II shipwrecks in the Atlantic Ocean
Ships built in Hamburg
U-boats sunk by depth charges
U-boats sunk by British aircraft
Ships lost with all hands
Maritime incidents in October 1943